In organic chemistry, a methylidyne group or just methylidyne is a neutral part of a molecule (a substituent or functional group) with formula , consisting of a carbon atom bonded to a hydrogen atom by one single bond and to the rest of the molecule by one triple bond.  For example, a methylidyne group is present in n-methylidyne-1-hexanaminium, .

The name "methylidyne" is also used for the methylidyne radical (carbyne) , the same two atoms not bound to any other atom.

See also
 Methylene group or methylidene =
 Methylene bridge or methanediyl −−
 Methine group, methylylidene, or methanylylidene =CH−
 Methanetriyl group >CH−
 Methylylidyne group ≡C−

References

Substituents